The Church of Alexandria in Egypt is the Christian Church headed by the Patriarch of Alexandria. It is one of the original Apostolic Sees of Christianity, alongside Rome, Antioch, Constantinople and Jerusalem.

Tradition holds that the Church of Alexandria was founded by Saint Mark the Evangelist circa 49 AD and claims jurisdiction over all Christians on the African continent.

Today, three churches claim to be direct heirs of the original Church of Alexandria:
 The Coptic Orthodox Church, an Oriental Orthodox church
 The Greek Orthodox Church of Alexandria, part of the wider Eastern Orthodox Church
 The Coptic Catholic Church, one of 23 Eastern Catholic churches who are in full communion with the Catholic Church led by the Bishop of Rome

Formerly, also the Latin Patriarchate of Alexandria did so.

References

External links 

 The Catholic Encyclopedia Online: The Church of Alexandria

Christianity in Egypt
Apostolic sees